Fabriano Cathedral is a Roman Catholic cathedral in Fabriano, Italy, dedicated to San Venanzio (Saint Venantius of Camerino). It is the seat of the Bishop of Fabriano-Matelica.

History and description
The present church was built in the 14th century and rebuilt in 1607–1617 in a Baroque restoration, including stucco decoration and paintings by Gregorio Preti, Salvator Rosa, Giovanni Francesco Guerrieri, Giuseppe Puglia and Orazio Gentileschi. The apse belongs to the original 14th-century cathedral as do the cloister and the St Lawrence Chapel with frescoes (c. 1360) by Allegretto di Nuzio. The church  has also frescoes depicting the Story of the True Cross (1415) by Giovanni di Corraduccio.

Sources
Website of the Diocese of Fabriano-Matelica: the parish of the cathedral 
 Website of the Diocese of Fabriano-Matelica: history of the cathedral 
www.settembreorganistico.it: the organ 

Cathedral
Baroque architecture in Marche
Roman Catholic cathedrals in Italy
Cathedrals in the Marche
Minor basilicas in Marche
Roman Catholic churches completed in 1617
1617 establishments in Italy
Churches in the Province of Ancona